Cédric Ido (born 22 October 1980) is a French-Burkinabe director, writer and actor. He grew up in Stains, Seine-Saint-Denis, a small suburban town near Paris and in Ouagadougou, Burkina Faso during Thomas Sankara’s revolution. His directing works have been exhibited worldwide in film festivals such as Seattle, Dubai and Venice.

In 2015 he won the African Movie Academy Awards for best short film with Twaaga, which takes place in Burkina Faso during Thomas Sankara's revolution. He has directed his brother, actor Jacky Ido, on a number of films including Chateau, and Hasaki Ya Suda.

Filmography

References

External links

1980 births
Living people
French film directors
French male film actors
French male screenwriters
French people of Burkinabé descent